Angadi is an Indian surname, from Kannada (ಅಂಗಡಿ) angaḍi meaning 'store' or 'shop'. Notable people with the surname include:

 Ashwini Angadi, global ambassador and advocate of disability rights
 Darien Angadi (1949–1981), British singer and actor, son of Patricia
 Patricia Angadi (1914–2001), British portrait painter and novelist
 Suresh Angadi (born 1955), Indian politician